Aldo Florenzi (born 2 April 2002) is an Italian professional footballer who plays as a midfielder for  club Cosenza.

Career
Florenzi made his Serie B debut for Cosenza on 22 August 2021, in a game against Ascoli.

References

External links
 
 

2002 births
Living people
People from Nuoro
Footballers from Sardinia
Italian footballers
Association football midfielders
A.C. ChievoVerona players
Cosenza Calcio players
Serie B players